The second Rudd ministry (Labor) was the 67th ministry of the Australian government, led by Prime Minister Kevin Rudd. It succeeded the second Gillard ministry after a leadership spill within the Australian Labor Party that took place on 26 June 2013.  Three members of the ministry were sworn in by Governor-General Quentin Bryce on 27 June 2013.  These were Kevin Rudd, Prime Minister; Anthony Albanese, Deputy Prime Minister; and Chris Bowen, Treasurer. The remainder of the ministry were sworn in on 1 July 2013.

The Labor Party lost the general election held on 7 September 2013, paving the way for Coalition leader Tony Abbott. The ministry concluded on 18 September 2013 when the Abbott ministry was sworn in.

27 June 2013 – 18 September 2013

Cabinet

Outer ministry

Parliamentary secretaries

See also
Rudd government (2013)

References

External links
Second Rudd ministry list – Australian politics – 1 July 2013

Ministries of Elizabeth II
Rudd 2
Australian Labor Party ministries
Ministry 2
2013 establishments in Australia
2013 disestablishments in Australia
Cabinets established in 2013
Cabinets disestablished in 2013